The Detroit Film Critics Society Award for Best Actress is an annual award given by the Detroit Film Critics Society to honor the best actress that year.

Winners 

 † indicates the winner of the Academy Award for Best Actress.

2000s

2010s

2020s

Notes

References

Detroit Film Critics Society Awards
Film awards for lead actress
Lists of films by award